Haunted (Turkish: Musallat) is a 2007 Turkish horror film directed by Alper Mestçi about a young Turkish guest-worker who is haunted by dark visions in Berlin.

Production
The film was shot on location in Istanbul, Turkey and Berlin, Germany.

Plot synopsis
Suat is a young Turkish man who leaves his new bride Nurcan behind in Turkey and joins his childhood friend Metin in Berlin where he can earn some money. Here he is haunted by dark visions that eventually drive him to attempt suicide. When the doctors in Germany can find nothing wrong, Suat and Metin return to Istanbul to seek the advice of spiritual healer Haci Burhan Kasavi. Suat and family of Haci except a daughter of Haci was killed by a demon angry about him for being killed when born as the baby of Nurcan.
Musallat 2: Lanet (2011) by the same company is about a young woman find she is a relative of a jinn and being born after a couple asked a witch to ask for a child for a jinn through the cut animal legs sorcerery ritual.

Casts
Burak Özçivit as Suat
Biğkem Karavus as Nurcan
Kurtuluş Şakirağaoğlu as Haci Burhan Kasavi
İbrahim Can as Metin

Release

Reception

Box office
The film was the tenth highest grossing Turkish film of 2007 with a total gross of $1,802,504.

The worldwide total gross rose to $2,170,188 following international release in 2008.

Reviews 
Todd Brown, writing for Twitch Film, claims to have been, drawn in by the simple but compelling story of a young family haunted and possessed, with, a pretty compelling blend of pulp with legitimate tension, which looks to ride that same split in influences, of technical proficiency and just plain pulp that has long been the mark of Turkish genre films, though the technical end looks stronger than most, with, truly moody and unsettling imagery. If the film comes close to living up to the trailer this thing is EASILY going to be the best Turkish genre picture of the past five to ten years, he concludes.

Chris Churchill, also writing for Twitch Film, adds that, The film also scored Theatrical releases in a few European countries earlier in the year, something quite rare for Turkish genre films in the past, so there could be something that makes Musallat stand out from the recent crop of Turkish Horror films produced.

See also
2007 in film
Turkish films of 2007

External links

References

2007 films
2007 horror films
Films set in Turkey
Turkish horror films
Genies in film
2000s Turkish-language films